Damien Brown (born 25 December 1984) is an Australian mixed martial artist who competes in the lightweight division. A professional since 2010, he has also competed for the Ultimate Fighting Championship, Rizin FF, BRACE, and Cage Warriors.

Background
Brown was born in Albury, New South Wales, Australia. He is a full-time prison officer and a veteran of the Australian Army, serving as an infantry soldier, who was deployed to Afghanistan in 2007. He credits MMA training helping him to recover his post-traumatic stress and depression from his active service in the war zone. He would like to be the role model for the war veterans who suffer from  PTSD,  showing them the hopes and using the cage as the platform to advocate greater support for war veterans which they much deserved.

Brown started Zen Do Kai martial arts training  when he was a kid. After return from military service from Afghanistan with some injuries, Brown joined a local Kickboxing school as part of the rehab program to improve his physical fitness and his professional career began one year later after he picked up BJJ training.

Mixed martial arts career

Early career
Brown participated in various MMA promotions as such Australian Fighting Championship (AFC), BRACE, European-based Cage Warriors Fighting Championship. He held a 5 win streak prior signed by Ultimate Fighting Championship (UFC).

Ultimate Fighting Championship
Brown made his promotional debut on one week-notice debut in March 2016 at UFC Fight Night 85 against Alan Patrick and lost by decision (unanimous).

He took on Cesar Arzamendia, a veteran of the Ultimate Fighter Latin America 2, at UFC 201 in July 2016 and won by knockout in round 1.

At UFC Fight Night 101, Brown managed to steal a victory against Jon Tuck with a split decision.

Brown faced Vinc Pichel at UFC Fight Night 110 on 11 June 2017. He lost the fight via knockout in the first round.

Brown faced Frank Camacho on 19 November 2017, at UFC Fight Night: Werdum vs. Tybura. At the weight-ins,  Camacho weighed in at 160 pounds, 4 pounds over the lightweight upper limit of 156 pounds. The bout proceeded at a catchweight and Camacho forfeited 30% of his purse to Brown. He lost the fight via split decision. This fight earned him Fight of the Night bonus.

Brown faced Dong Hyun Ma on 11 February 2018 at UFC 221. He lost the fight by split decision.

On July 2, 2018, it was announced that Brown was released from UFC.

Post-UFC career
After his release from the UFC, Brown signed a two-fight contract with Rizin FF. Brown made his promotional debut against fellow UFC veteran Daron Cruickshank at Rizin 14 on December 31, 2018. He won the fight via submission in the first round.

As the second and last fight of his prevailing contract, Brown faced Koji Takeda at Rizin 15 on April 21, 2019. Brown won the fight via unanimous decision.

Riding a two-win streak, Brown signed a new contract with Rizin and joined the 2019 Lightweight Grand Prix. In the opening round of the grand prix, Brown faced Tofiq Musayev at Rizin 19 on October 12, 2019. Brown lost the fight via TKO in the first round.

Championships and accomplishments
Ultimate Fighting Championship
Fight of the Night (one time) vs. Frank Camacho

Mixed martial arts record

|-
|Loss
|align=center|19–13
|Tofiq Musayev
|TKO (head kick and punches)
|Rizin 19
|
|align=center|1
|align=center|4:14
|Osaka, Japan
|
|-
|Win
|align=center|19–12
|Koji Takeda
|Decision (unanimous)
|Rizin 15
|
|align=center|3
|align=center|5:00
|Yokohama, Japan
|
|-
|Win
|align=center|18–12
|Daron Cruickshank
|Submission (guillotine choke)
|Rizin 14
|
|align=center|1
|align=center|4:19
|Saitama, Japan 
|
|-
|Loss
|align=center|17–12
|Dong Hyun Ma
|Decision (split)
|UFC 221 
|
|align=center|3
|align=center|5:00
|Perth, Australia
|
|-
|Loss
|align=center|17–11
|Frank Camacho
|Decision (split)
|UFC Fight Night: Werdum vs. Tybura
|
|align=center|3
|align=center|5:00
|Sydney, Australia
|
|-
|Loss
|align=center|17–10
|Vinc Pichel
|KO (punches)
|UFC Fight Night: Lewis vs. Hunt
|
|align=center|1
|align=center|3:37
|Auckland, New Zealand
|
|-
| Win
| align=center| 17–9
| Jon Tuck
| Decision (split)
| UFC Fight Night: Whittaker vs. Brunson
| 
| align=center| 3
| align=center| 5:00
| Melbourne, Australia 
|
|-
| Win
| align=center| 16–9
| Cesar Arzamendia
| TKO (punches)
| UFC 201
| 
| align=center| 1
| align=center| 2:27
| Atlanta, Georgia, United States 
|
|-
| Loss
| align=center| 15–9
| Alan Patrick 
| Decision (unanimous)
| UFC Fight Night: Hunt vs. Mir
| 
| align=center| 3
| align=center| 5:00
| Brisbane, Australia 
| 
|-
| Win
| align=center| 15–8
| Pumau Campbell
| TKO (punches)
| XFC 26
| 
| align=center| 3
| align=center| 1:14
| Brisbane, Australia
|
|-
| Win
| align=center| 14–8
| Ben Games
| Submission (rear-naked choke)
| BRACE 37
| 
| align=center| 2
| align=center| 1:57
| Canberra, Australia
|
|-
| Win
| align=center| 13–8
| Grant Toatoa
| Submission (guillotine choke)
| NZFC 1: A New Beginning
| 
| align=center| 1
| align=center| 2:29
| Christchurch, New Zealand
|
|-
| Win
| align=center| 12–8
| Abel Brites
| Submission (guillotine choke)
| BRACE 36 
| 
| align=center| 1
| align=center| 0:17
| Sydney, Australia
|
|-
| Win
| align=center| 11–8
| Shane Young
| Decision (majority)
| XFC 23
| 
| align=center| 5
| align=center| 5:00
| Brisbane, Australia 
|
|-
| Loss
| align=center| 10–8
| Ricky Rea
| Submission (rear-naked choke)
| FightWorld Cup 18
| 
| align=center| 1
| align=center| 3:28
| Nerang, Australia
|
|-
| Loss
| align=center| 10–7
| Tim Wilde
| Decision (unanimous)
| CWFC 69
| 
| align=center| 3
| align=center| 5:00
| London, England
| 
|-
| Loss
| align=center| 10–6
| Paul Redmond 
| Decision (unanimous)
| CWFC 65
| 
| align=center| 3
| align=center| 5:00
| Dublin, Ireland
| 
|-
| Loss
| align=center| 10–5
| Julien Boussuge
| Decision (unanimous)
| CWFC 61 
| 
| align=center| 3
| align=center| 5:00
| Amman, Jordan
| 
|-
| Win
| align=center| 10–4
| Scott MacGregor 
| Submission (armbar)
| K.O. Martial Arts: Adrenalin-Unleashed
| 
| align=center| 1
| align=center| 4:58
| Eatons Hill, Australia
|
|-
| Loss
| align=center| 9–4
| Yusuke Kasuya
| Submission (armbar)
| Legend FC 11
| 
| align=center| 3
| align=center| 4:47
| Kuala Lumpur, Malaysia
| 
|-
| Win
| align=center| 9–3
| Rob Hill
| Decision (unanimous)
| BRACE 19
| 
| align=center| 3
| align=center| 5:00
| Sydney, Australia
| 
|-
| Win
| align=center| 8–3
| Haotian Wu
| Decision (unanimous)
| Legend FC 9
| 
| align=center| 3
| align=center| 5:00
| Macau, SAR, China
| 
|-
| Win
| align=center| 7–3
| Luke Hume
| Decision (unanimous)
| Nitro MMA 5 
| 
| align=center| 1
| align=center| 0:57
| Logan City, Australia
| 
|-
| Loss
| align=center| 6–3
| Koji Ando
| Submission (reverse triangle choke)
| Legend FC 7
| 
| align=center| 1
| align=center| 2:27
| Macau, SAR, China
|
|-
| Loss
| align=center| 6–2
| Patrick Iodice
| TKO (punches)
| FightWorld Cup 10
| 
| align=center| 1
| align=center| 0:07
| Nerang, Australia
|
|-
| Loss
| align=center| 6–1
| Sonny Brown
| Submission (gogoplata)
| BRACE 11
| 
| align=center| 3
| align=center| 3:01
| Brisbane, Australia
|
|-
| Win
| align=center| 6–0
| Gokhan Turkyilmaz
| TKO (corner stoppage)
| Nitro 3
| 
| align=center| 3
| align=center| 3:54
| Queensland, Australia
| 
|-
| Win
| align=center| 5–0
| Thomas Ruderman
| Submission (rear-naked choke)
| BRACE 9
| 
| align=center| 1
| align=center| 1:39
| Townsville, Australia
| 
|-
| Win
| align=center| 4–0
| Luke Stevens
| Decision (unanimous)
| Nitro MMA 2
| 
| align=center| 3
| align=center| 5:00
| Logan City, Australia
| 
|-
| Win
| align=center| 3–0
| Jay Thompson
| Submission (armbar)
| Golden Lion Promotions: Christmas Bash 2010
| 
| align=center| 1
| align=center| 1:45
| Townsville, Australia
| 
|-
| Win
| align=center| 2–0
| Kenny Yeung
| Decision (unanimous)
| AFC 1 
| 
| align=center| 3
| align=center| 3:00
| Melbourne, Australia
| 
|-
| Win
| align=center| 1–0
| Tim Radley
| Submission (rear-naked choke)
| Fate MMA: Beyond Human Control
| 
| align=center| 1
| align=center| N/A
| Beenleigh, Australia
|

See also
 List of male mixed martial artists

References

External links
 
 
 
 

Australian male mixed martial artists
Lightweight mixed martial artists
Welterweight mixed martial artists
Mixed martial artists utilizing karate
Mixed martial artists utilizing Brazilian jiu-jitsu
1984 births
Living people
Australian male karateka
Sportspeople from Albury
Sportsmen from Queensland
Australian practitioners of Brazilian jiu-jitsu
People awarded a black belt in Brazilian jiu-jitsu
Ultimate Fighting Championship male fighters